Surveillance is a 2006 film directed by Fritz Kiersch and starring Armand Assante and Nick Cornish.

Cast
Armand Assante as Harley
Nick Cornish as Dennis
Laurie Fortier as Claire
Robert Rusler as Ben Palmer
Nando Betancur as Stock Boy

Production
Filming took place in Oklahoma City, Oklahoma.

References

2006 films
Films directed by Fritz Kiersch
2000s English-language films